Abitain is a commune in the Pyrénées-Atlantiques department in the Nouvelle-Aquitaine region in southwestern France.

The inhabitants are known as Abitainois, or Abitaonoises.

Geography

Location
Abitain is bordered on the eastern side by the Gave d'Oloron about 20 km southeast of Peyrehorade and 11 km southwest of Salies-de-Béarn. Access to the commune is by road D936 from Escos in the north, passing south down the eastern side of the commune through the village and continuing to Autevielle-Saint-Martin-Bideren in the south.

Hydrography
Located in the Drainage basin of the Adour, the commune's eastern border is the Gave d'Oloron, which joins the Gave de Pau at Peyrehorade which flows a further 10 km as the Gaves Réunis before joining the Adour river. A number of small streams flow in the commune including Le Crabé which flows into the Gave d'Oloron at the northern border of the commune and the Arrioutèque creek.

Localities and hamlets

Aunès
Benes
Le Bois
Bonnefont
la Bordenave
Constantine
Coustalat
Couyoula
Dupont
Etchebarne
Labie
Lafite
Lartigue
Latéoulère
le Lot
Peyre
Plain
Pouey
Reyen
Richard
Ségabache
Treyture
La Tuilerie

Neighbouring Communes and Villages

Toponymy
The commune's name in Béarnais is Avitenh.

Michel Grosclaude proposed a Latin etymology of Avitus (name of a man called "Avit") plus the Gascon suffix -enh.

The following table details the origins of the commune name and other names in the commune.

Sources:

Raymond: Topographic Dictionary of the Department of Basses-Pyrenees, 1863, on the page numbers indicated in the table. 
Grosclaude: Toponymic Dictionary of communes, Béarn, 2006 
Cassini: Cassini Map from 1750

Origins:
Bayonne: Cartulary of Bayonne or Livre d'Or (Book of Gold)
Census: Census of Béarn
Notaries: Notaries of Labastide-Villefranche
Reformation: Reformation of Béarn
Insinuations: Insinuations of the Diocese of Oloron 
Regulations: Regulations of the States of Béarn  
Denombrement: Denombremont
Terrier: Terrier of Abitain.
Chapter: Titles of the Chapter of Bayonne

History
The village of Abitain formed on the left bank of the Gave d'Oloron around its Lay Abbey, vassal of the Viscounts of Bearn, a building which still remains. The families of Belloc then Claverie were the abbot patrons of the parish. The tomb of the last lay abbot of Abitain, who died in 1785, is in the church of Saint-Pierre.

Paul Raymond, on page 2 of his 1863 dictionary, noted that in 1385 the town had 15 fires and depended on the bailiwick of Sauveterre.

In 1648 the barony of Lons became a marquisate, which included Abitain, Anoye, Baleix, Castillon, Juillacq, Le Leu (hamlet Oraàs), Samsons-Lion, Lons, Maspie, Oraàs, Peyrède (fief Oraàs), Sauvagnon, and Viellepinte.

The village had two mills: one at Leü (which actually depended on Oraàs) and one at Séguabache - now a sawmill.

In 1856, Ferdinand Carrère, heir to the last Lay Abbey demolished the old abbey castle to build Carrère castle in Escos.

In February 1814, the town was occupied by the troops of General Morillo and by the English, facing the French entrenched in Oraàs.

A famous ferry - where there was a tragic accident in 1845 - has long been in service between Moliède and Athos.

Administration

List of Successive Mayors of Abitain

Intercommunality
The town is a member of seven inter-communal organisations:
the Communauté de communes du Béarn des Gaves
the Public agency for local management
the inter-communal centre for social action of Sauveterre-de-Béarn;
the intercommunal union of communal associations of Gave d'Oloron and Mauléon-Licharre
the inter-communal union for Rivers and Lakes
the AEP Union of Sauveterre-de-Béarn
the Energy Union of Pyrénées-Atlantiques

Population

Economy

The activity of the commune is mainly agricultural. A sawmill is also in operation.

The town is part of the Appellation d'origine contrôlée (AOC) zone designation of Ossau-iraty.

Culture and Heritage

Civil heritage
There are only the ruins of the Leu mill which have been the subject of numerous lawsuits. Another mill, called Séguabache, is the current sawmill and is easily visible in the commune.

Religious Heritage

During the construction of the clock tower in 1926 what remained of the old lay abbey was destroyed. In the old abbey there was a special room where the Lord of the Manor could overlook the church choir and follow the Mass without being in the crowd. The abbey enclosure can still be seen.

The Tombstone of the last lord of Abitain was discovered during the restoration of the church. It was marked on the wall of the church to preserve its memory.

The Parish Church of Saint Pierre (19th century), of Romanesque origin, still has the arms of the Abitain abbots (Blason: Azure, with two stars Or in chief) from the burial of the last abbot. There is a 16th-century window of Germanic origin. Also in the church (in the attic) is an altarpiece from the 17th century.

The Cemetery contains the graves of priests and that of Father Joffre, Capuchin missionary in Canada who died at Abitain in 1909. There is also the tomb of Colonel Count Pierre de Chevigne, Companion of the Liberation, one of the greats of béarnaise politics and a strong and faithful supporter of General de Gaulle. The coat of arms of Chevigne are engraved on his tomb with the motto "Quod decet". He donated land and equipment to the communes of Abitain and Escos.

Notable People linked to the Commune
Pierre de Chevigné, born in Toulon in 1909 and died in Biarritz in 2004 was a colonel and French politician, a Minister in the Fourth Republic and a companion of the Liberation. He was mayor of Abitain from 1935 to 1940 and from 1945 to 1965.

See also
Communes of the Pyrénées-Atlantiques department

References

Communes of Pyrénées-Atlantiques